Colonel Sir Edward Archibald Ruggles-Brise, 1st Baronet  (19 September 1882 – 12 May 1942) was a British Conservative Party politician.

Early life
The son of Archibald Weyland Ruggles Brise (1857-1939), he was born at Westminster, London, in September 1882 and was educated at Eton College and Cambridge University.

Career

Public service
He was magistrate and a Deputy Lieutenant for Essex from 1920. In 1939 he was appointed as a Vice Lieutenant of Essex.

Political career
He served as Member of Parliament (MP) for the Maldon constituency in Essex from 1922 until his death in 1942, with a brief interruption from 1923 to 1924 when he narrowly lost the seat to his Labour opponent Valentine Crittall.

Ruggles-Brise was greatly interested in agricultural matters, serving on the Smallholdings Committee of Essex County Council and as Chairman of the Parliamentary Agricultural Committee.

Military career
From 1927, he commanded the 104th Essex Yeomanry Field Brigade, Royal Artillery of the Territorial Army.

Sport
Ruggles-Brise was a cricketer below first-class play level. He made one appearance making 27 runs at county level for Shropshire in 1904, while playing at club level for Ellesmere.

Personal life
Ruggles-Brise was a landowner and was the owner of Spains Hall in Finchingfield, Essex, which had been inherited by his father, Archibald Weyland Ruggles-Brise, on the death of his own father, the politician Samuel Ruggles-Brise.

He married twice. Firstly, in 1906, to Agatha Gurney (1881–1937), daughter of John Henry Gurney Jr., a member of the Gurney family of Keswick Hall, Norfolk. Secondly, in 1939, to Lucy Barbara Pym MBE (1895–1979), daughter of Walter Ruthven Pym, Bishop of Bombay.

Following his death in May 1942 aged 59, he was succeeded in the baronetcy by his son Colonel Sir John Archibald Ruggles-Brise, 2nd Baronet.

Honours and decorations
In the 1935 Jubilee Honours List, he was made a Baronet, of Spains Hall, in Essex.

References

Sources

External links 
 

1882 births
1942 deaths
Military personnel from London
People from Westminster
Recipients of the Legion of Honour
Essex Yeomanry officers
Royal Artillery officers
Recipients of the Military Cross
Deputy Lieutenants of Essex
Conservative Party (UK) MPs for English constituencies
Baronets in the Baronetage of the United Kingdom
UK MPs 1922–1923
UK MPs 1924–1929
UK MPs 1929–1931
UK MPs 1931–1935
UK MPs 1935–1945
British Army personnel of World War I
People from Finchingfield
Members of Parliament for Maldon